Kouva is a village in Pudasjärvi, Finland. Year 2004, Kouva had 47 inhabitants. A smaller village, with the name Jäkälavaara is located just  from Kouva. Kouva is also close to the Syöte National Park. Kouva is located close to a small lake.

Pudasjärvi
Villages in Finland